Arctia rueckbeili is a moth of the family Erebidae first described by Rudolf Püngeler in 1901. It is found in Tien Shan, Alai and Turkestan mountains in Central Asia within Kyrghyzstan, Uzbekistan, Tajikistan, and Chinese province of Xinjiang at altitudes 1300–3500 m. The moth flies June to July.

References

Arctiina
Moths described in 1901
Moths of Asia